Pettit Lake is a large alpine lake in Blaine County, Idaho, United States, located in the Sawtooth Valley in the Sawtooth National Recreation Area.

Pettit Lake is accessed from State Highway 75 via Sawtooth National Forest road 205.  There are campgrounds and trailheads around Pettit Lake.

In the southern section of the Sawtooth Valley, Pettit Lake is the third largest lake in Sawtooth National Recreation Area.

References

See also
 List of lakes of the Sawtooth Mountains (Idaho)
 Sawtooth National Forest
 Sawtooth National Recreation Area
 Sawtooth Range (Idaho)

Lakes of Idaho
Lakes of Blaine County, Idaho
Glacial lakes of the United States
Glacial lakes of the Sawtooth National Forest